Antti Hölli (born July 16, 1987) is a Finnish ice hockey player.

Holli made his SM-liiga debut playing with Tappara during the 2006–07 SM-liiga season.

Career statistics

References

External links

1987 births
Living people
Finnish ice hockey right wingers
Herlev Eagles players
Herning Blue Fox players
Ilves players
Lempäälän Kisa players
MHC Martin players
Milton Keynes Lightning players
Peliitat Heinola players
SønderjyskE Ishockey players
Tappara players
Vaasan Sport players
Finnish expatriate ice hockey players in Denmark
Finnish expatriate ice hockey players in England
Finnish expatriate ice hockey players in Slovakia